The 2022–23 Ligue 1, also known as Ligue 1 Uber Eats for sponsorship reasons, is the 85th season of the Ligue 1, France's premier football competition. It began on 5 August 2022 and will conclude on 4 June 2023. 

As the 2022 FIFA World Cup began on 20 November, the last round before the break was held on 12–13 November. The league subsequently resumed on 27 December. Four clubs are to be relegated to Ligue 2 at the end of the season as the number of clubs will be reduced to 18 starting from the 2023–24 season. As a result, no play-offs will be held at the end of the season. This is the last season played with 20 teams.

Paris Saint-Germain are the defending champions.

Teams
A total of twenty teams are participating in the 2022–23 edition of the Ligue 1.

Changes
Toulouse (promoted after a two-year absence), Ajaccio (promoted to Ligue 1 after an eight-year absence), and AJ Auxerre (promoted after a ten-year absence) were promoted from the 2021–22 Ligue 2. Bordeaux (relegated after thirty years in the top flight), Metz (relegated after three years in the top flight) and Saint-Étienne (relegated after eighteen years in the top flight) were relegated to 2022–23 Ligue 2.

Stadiums and locations

Number of teams by regions

Personnel and kits

Managerial changes

League table

Results

Season statistics

Top goalscorers

Top assists

Clean sheets

Hat-tricks

Discipline

Player
 Most yellow cards: 8
 Benjamin André (Lille)
 Jens Cajuste (Reims)
 Maximiliano Caufriez (Clermont)
 Oumar Gonzalez (Ajaccio)
 Mounaïm El Idrissy (Ajaccio)
 Batista Mendy (Angers)
 Marco Verratti (Paris Saint-Germain)
 Most red cards: 2
 Emmanuel Agbadou (Reims)
 Mama Baldé (Troyes)
 Samuel Gigot (Marseille)
 Romain Hamouma (Ajaccio)
 M'Baye Niang (Auxerre)
 Téji Savanier (Montpellier)
 Jean-Clair Todibo (Nice)

Team
 Most yellow cards: 60
Lille
 Most red cards: 9
Montpellier
 Fewest yellow cards: 27
Lorient
 Fewest red cards: 1
Lens
Lille

Awards

Monthly

References

External links

Ligue 1 seasons
1
France
France